is a former Japanese football player.

Playing career
Uchida was born in Osaka Prefecture on May 22, 1975. He joined J2 League club Ventforet Kofu in 2001. He debuted as defender against Kyoto Purple Sanga on May 6. However he could only play this match and Ventforet finished at the bottom place in 2001 season for 3 years in a row. He left the club end of 2001 season.

Club statistics

References

External links

1975 births
Living people
Association football people from Osaka Prefecture
Japanese footballers
J2 League players
Ventforet Kofu players
Association football midfielders